t Haantje (the Little Rooster) is a small village in the northeastern Netherlands. It is situated northwest of Emmen and is part of the municipality of Coevorden.

't Haantje was first mentioned in 1874. The etymology is unclear. It was founded when peat labourers decided to settle there. On 1 December 1965, the village barely escaped a disaster. A French company working for the N.A.M. was drilling for gas, and started to lose control of the enormous gas pressure. During the afternoon, this resulted in a huge gas eruption. The ground around the hole caved in - swallowing all of the drilling equipment. The gas eruption was eventually stopped by a cement injection from a new drilling hole. A small lake lake surrounded by a forest forms a permanent reminder of this event.

References

External links

Website municipality of Coevorden

Coevorden
Populated places in Drenthe